August Oberwelland (born August Storck) was a German entrepreneur and the founder of confectionery manufacturer August Storck.

Life 

August Oberwelland was owner of farm Oberwellandhof in Westphalia. Together with three workers he started his company, the German company Werther’sche Zuckerwarenfabrik, that he founded in 1903 in Werther and which produced sweet candies for Westphalia.  After World War I, Hugo Oberwelland (the youngest of the three sons of August) followed his father and took over the management of the factory in 1921.

External links 
 Official website by Storck.com

References 

Year of birth missing
Year of death missing
German company founders
20th-century German businesspeople